The 5th Liaison Squadron is an inactive United States Air Force unit.  It was first activated during World War II as the 5th Observation Squadron.  It served as a training unit for cooperation with field artillery until 1942, when that mission was assumed by the artillery.  After training in the United States, it deployed to India in 1944, where it served in combat as the 5th Liaison Squadron until V-J Day, returning to the United States for inactivation in 1946.  The squadron was active in the United States as a liaison and a helicopter unit.  It was last active at Elmendorf Air Force Base, Alaska in 1954.

History

World War II

Training in the United States

The 5th Observation Squadron was activated on 7 February 1942 at Post Field, Oklahoma as the 5th Observation Squadron.  The squadron replaced Flight E of the 16th Observation Squadron, which had supported the Field Artillery School since 1931.  It was initially equipped with the Curtiss O-52 Owl observation aircraft, but also flew the Douglas B-18 Bolo bomber, and a number of light aircraft, commonly called "Grasshoppers."

The 5th was assigned directly to the Office of the Chief of Air Corps and attached to the Field Artillery School, providing aircraft for training with the school.  However, in July 1942, the United States Army decided that field artillery units would have assigned aircraft to serve as air observation posts.  These planes and pilots would be assigned to the field artillery, not the air corps, and the school to train them would be located at Post Field.  In August, the squadron was relieved of its attachment to the artillery school and moved to Marshall Field, Kansas to make way for the first arriving class, which began in September.   

The squadron moved to Desert Center Army Air Field, where it supported units training at the Desert Training Center, later relocating to Thermal Army Air Field in September.  It converted entirely to "Grasshopper" aircraft in April 1943, becoming the 5th Liaison Squadron.  The pilots of these light planes were enlisted, rather than officers.  In October, it moved to Alamo Army Air Field, Texas and prepared for movement overseas.

Combat in India and  Burma

In February 1944, the squadron departed the United States for the China-Burma-India Theater, arriving at Ledo Airfield, India in April.  From August 1944 until May 1945, Tenth Air Force created the 1st Liaison Group, a provisional unit that included the 5th, along with the 19th, 71st and 115th Liaison Squadrons for operations. While in the CBI Theater it flew 33,904 sorties. In the course of 14 months of operations, 40 squadron aircraft were destroyed in accidents or by enemy action, on one occasion it lost three Stinson L-1 Vigilants in an attempt to rescue a downed bomber crewmember from an improvised airstrip in a jungle clearing. Two squadron pilots were killed in the line of duty and two others were MIA and later declared dead. It evacuated over 4,000 casualties from makeshift jungle airstrips and carried hundreds of tons of equipment and supplies and thousands of passengers. 

In addition, the squadron's pilots often acted as forward air controllers, directing attacks against Japanese gun positions and troops. The squadron remained in theater until late 1945, then returned to the United States and was inactivated at the Port of Embarkation, Camp Kilmer, New Jersey, in January 1946.

Post war operations
A little over a year later, the squadron was activated  at Greenville Army Air Base, South Carolina.  It was inactivated there in April 1949.

A few months later, the squadron was redesignated the 5th Helicopter Squadron.  It was activated at Pope Air Force Base, North Carolina in October 1949 and equipped with Sikorsky H-5 helicopters.  It was inactivated in July 1952.

The squadron returned to its designation as a liaison unit and was activated at Sewart Air Force Base, Tennessee in September 1952.  At Sewart, it trained for Arctic operations with de Havilland Canada L-20 Beavers.  It moved to Elmendorf Air Force Base, Alaska in April 1953 and operated the Beaver from several locations in Alaska until inactivating in July 1954.

Lineage
 Constituted as the 5th Observation Squadron (Special) on 28 January 1942
 Activated on 7 February 1942
 Redesignated 5th Observation Squadron on 8 August 1942
 Redesignated 5th Liaison Squadron on 2 April 1943
 Inactivated on 11 January 1946
 Activated on 15 October 1947
 Inactivated on 1 April 1949
 Redesignated 5th Helicopter Squadron on 27 September 1949
 Activated on 27 October 1949
 Inactivated on 22 July 1952
 Redesignated 5th Liaison Squadron on 14 August 1952
 Activated on 8 September 1952
 Inactivated on 18 June 1954

Assignments

 Office of Chief of Air Corps, 7 February 1942 (attached to United States Army Field Artillery School) 
 Army Air Forces, 9 March 1942 (attached to Field Artillery School) 
 74th Observation Group, 8 August 1942 (attached to Field Artillery School to Aug 1942)
 77th Observation Group, 25 January 1943 
 74th Reconnaissance Group, 2 April 1943 
 IV Air Support Command (later III Tactical Air Division), 11 August 1943 (attached to 74th Tactical Reconnaissance Group, 17 August – c. 15 September 1943)
 II Tactical Air Division, 12 October 1943 
 Army Air Forces, India-Burma Sector, 28 March 1944 (attached to Northern Combat Area Command, 20 May – August 1944); 
 Tenth Air Force, 21 Aug 1944 (attached to 1st Liaison Group [Provisional], 29 August 1944, North Burma Air Task Force after 1 May 1945)
 Army Air Forces, India-Burma Sector, 31 July 1945 – 11 January 1946 (attached to North Burma Air Task Force until c. 5 September 1945)
 Ninth Air Force, 15 October 1947 (attached to 316th Troop Carrier Wing)
 Fourteenth Air Force, 1 February – 1 April 1949 (attached to 316th Troop Carrier Wing)
 Fourteenth Air Force 27 October 1949
 Tactical Air Command, 1 August 1950
 Ninth Air Force 5 October 1950 – 22 July 1952 (attached to 4415th Air Base Group after 4 April 1951)
 Eighteenth Air Force, 8 September 1952 (attached to 314th Troop Carrier Wing)
 Alaskan Air Command, 1 April 1953 (attached to 39th Air Depot Wing until 13 April 1953, then to 5039th Air Transport Group)
 5039th Air Base Wing, 1 July 1953 – 18 June 1954

Stations

 Post Field, Oklahoma, 7 February 1942
 Marshall Field, Kansas, 4 August 1942
 Cox Army Air Field, Texas, 18 May 1943
 Desert Center Army Air Field, 18 March 1943
 Thermal Army Air Field, 15 September 1943
 Alamo Army Air Field, Texas, 12 October 1943 – 27 February 1944
 Ledo Airfield, India, 20 April 1944
 Shaduzup, Burma, 30 April 1944
 Myitkyina, Burma, 3 Octoger 1944
 Bhamo, Burma 22 January 1945
 Kharagpur, India, c. 3 October – November 1945
 Camp Kilmer, New Jersey, 10–11 January 1946
 Greenville Army Air Base (later Greenville Air Force Base), South Carolina, 15 April 1947 – 1 April 1949
 Pope Air Force Base, North Carolina, 27 October 1949 – 22 July 1952
 Sewart Air Force Base, Tennessee, 8 September 1952
 Elmendorf Air Force Base, Alaska, 1 April 1953 – 18 June 1954
 Detachment at Ladd Air Force Base, Alaska
 Detachment at Bethel Air Force Station, Alaska

Aircraft

 Douglas B-18 Bolo, 1942-1943
 Curtiss O-52 Owl, 1942-1943
 Aeronca L-3 Grasshopper, 1942-1943
 Stinson L-1 Vigilant, 1942–1943, 1944-1945
 Piper L-4 Grasshopper, 1942–1943, 1945, 1948-1949
 Interstate L-6 Cadet, 1942-1943
 Stinson L-5 Sentinel, 1943–1945, 1948-1949
 Stinson L-13, 1947-1948
 Sikorsky H-5, 1949-1951
 de Havilland Canada L-20 Beaver, 1952-1954

Campaigns

See also
 Air Observation Post

References

Notes
 Explanatory notes

 Citations

Bibliography

 
  
 
 
 
 

005
005